This is a list of foreign football players in Hong Kong First Division League.

The following players must meet both of the following two criteria:

Have played at least one Hong Kong First Division League, Hong Kong Senior Challenge Shield, Hong Kong League Cup, Hong Kong FA Cup, Hong Kong Viceroy Cup or AFC club competition match for First Division club.
Are considered foreign, i.e., outside China, determined by the following:
A player is considered foreign if he is not eligible to play for the national teams of China, Hong Kong, Macau or Chinese Taipei.

The players in bold have at least one cap for their national team.

Australia 
Engelo Rumora - Wofoo Tai Po
Joel Wood - Tuen Mun Progoal

Bangladesh 
Kazi Salahuddin - Caroline Hill FC

Bolivia 
José Castillo - South China

Bosnia and Herzegovina 
Milija Žižić - Kitchee

Botswana 
Destiny O Ugo - Hong Kong FC

Brazil 
Alexandre de Moraes - Rangers
Alexandro Vieira Xavier - Rangers
Jorginho - Citizen
Dênisson Ricardo de Souza - Happy Valley
Evanor - Happy Valley
Fábio Lopes Alcântara - Happy Valley, Shatin
Fabrício Lopes Alcântara - Happy Valley
Ícaro Passos de Oliveira - Happy Valley
José Ricardo Rambo - Happy Valley
Juninho Petrolina - Happy Valley
Vandré Sagrilo Monteiro - Happy Valley, South China
Vítor - Happy Valley, Xiangxue Sun Hei
Anderson da Silva - Kitchee
Cleiton Mendes dos Santos - South China
Detinho - South China, Citizen
Edemar Antônio Picoli - South China, Eastern
Michel Mesquita - South China
Tales Schutz - South China
Edgar Aldrighi Júnior - Wofoo Tai Po
Joel Bertoti Padilha - Wofoo Tai Po
Silvano Pessoa Monteiro - Wofoo Tai Po
Carlo André Bielemann Hartwig- Xiangxue Sun Hei
Giovane - Xiangxue Sun Hei, Convoy Sun Hei
Lico - Xiangxue Sun Hei
João Miguel - Xiangxue Sun Hei, Convoy Sun Hei
Márcio Gabriel Anacleto - Xiangxue Sun Hei
Celio Lino Oliveira - Bulova Rangers
Siumar Ferreira Nazaré - Bulova Rangers, Eastern
Leko - Citizen
Márcio Francisco da Silva - Citizen
Hélio José de Souza Gonçalves - Citizen
Paulinho Piracicaba - Citizen
Fábio Herbert de Souza - Convoy Sun Hei, Workable
Carlos Roberto dos Santos - Convoy Sun Hei
Edson José Jaguszeski - Convoy Sun Hei
Mauricio Pizzi - Convoy Sun Hei
Beto - Convoy Sun Hei
Paulo Jerônimo Ribeiro Ferreira - Eastern
Luciano Quadros da Silva - Eastern, Fourway Athletics, Kitchee
Jéferson Machado de Oliveira - Eastern
Djair Baptista Machado - Eastern
Márcio da Silva Dias - Eastern
Odair Hellmann - Eastern
Paulo Henrique Miranda - Eastern, Fourway Athletics
Rodrigo Andreis Galvão - Eastern
Fábio Noronha de Oliveira - Happy Valley,  TSW Pegasus
Tomy Adriano Giacomeli - Happy Valley
Diego Mendonça - Happy Valley
Fagner Gomes dos Santos - Happy Valley, Citizen
Domingos António Marcos - Happy Valley
Washington Luiz Pereira Santos - Happy Valley
Vandré Monteiro - Happy Valley
Willian Carlos Magri - Lanwa Redbull
Flavio Barros - South China
Itaparica - South China, TSW Pegasus
Maxwell - South China
Sidraílson - South China
Betine Rafael dos Santos - Wofoo Tai Po
Diego Balbinot - Workable
Elisandro Naressi Roos - Workable
Roberto Fronza - Workable, TSW Pegasus
Wilson Santos da Cruz - Workable
Sandro - Citizen
Paulo Rogério - Citizen
Marlon Mário Brandão da Silveira - Citizen
Max Suel da Cruz - Citizen
Anderson Moreno dos Santos - Convoy Sun Hei
Fabiano da Silva Diniz - Eastern
Edson Bugrão - Fourway Athletics
Sidicley Bernardo Nunes - Happy Valley
Eduardo de Morais Iannareli Carvalho - Happy Valley
Edson Ferreira da Silva - Sheffield United
Luiz Antonio Linhares Garcia - TSW Pegasus
Bruno Faifer Rubinato - Tuen Mun Progoal
Rafinha - Citizen
Neto - Shatin
Pablo Camilo de Souza - Shatin
Kahuê Rodrigues - Shatin
Fábio Magrão - Shatin
Maurício - Shatin
Ivissson - Shatin
Belém - Shatin
Leandro Carrijo - South China
Luiz Carlos - South China
Leonardo Ferreira da Silva - South China
Ramón - South China
Sidraílson - South China
Wellingsson - South China
Cahê - Sun Hei
Márcio Fábio Martins - TSW Pegasus
Marinho - TSW Pegasus

Cameroon 
Engelbert Romaric Asse-Etoga - Happy Valley
Ghislain Bell Bell - Rangers
Louis Berty Ayock - Rangers, Kitchee, TSW Pegasus
Francis Bertrand Yonga - Kitchee
Julius Akosah - Kitchee, Eastern
Wilfred Bamnjo - Kitchee, Convoy Sun Hei,
Jacques Martin Taninche Tchiegaing - Bulova Rangers
Jean-Jacques Kilama - Bulova Rangers, Fourway Athletics
Roger Batoum - Convoy Sun Hei
Ewane Guy Martial Ngassa - Kitchee
Hugues Naponick Nanmi - Kitchee, Tai Chung, NTR WF Tai Po
Nkewoun Nicolas Dieune - Lanwa Redbull
Pierre-Oliver Bakalag - Kitchee, Fourway Athletics
Cyrille Bella - Kitchee
Paul Ngue - Kitchee, Tai Chung
Eugene Mbome - TSW Pegasus
Guy Junior Ondoua - TSW Pegasus, Fourway Rangers
Celistanus Tita Chou - Tuen Mun Progoal, Fourway Rangers
Guy Hervé Mahop - Fourway Rangers
Georges-Andre Machia - TSW Pegasus

ndeme nkono samuel

Congo 
Michel De Buisson - Fourway Athletics
Edson Minga - Bulova Rangers

DR Congo 
Muana Lukalu - Fourway Athletics

Chad 
Ndolar Laoundoumaye Blaise - Happy Valley

Congo 
Delphin Tshibanda Tshibangu - Citizen

England 
Jaimes McKee - Hong Kong FC, Kitchee
Michael Anthony Sealy - Hong Kong FC
Jack Sealy - Hong Kong FC, South China
Kyle Alexander Jordan - Xiangxue Sun Hei
Andrew Russell - Happy Valley
Brett Storey - Shatin
Nicky Butt - South China

Equatorial Guinea 
Raúl Fabiani - Hong Kong Sapling
Baruc Nsue - Kitchee
Ronan Carolino Falcão - Citizen
Iván Zarandona – Biu Chun Rangers

France 
Gutenberg Nkounke - Bulova Rangers

Georgia 
Giorgi Kobakhidze - Happy Valley

Germany 
Heiner Backhaus - Kitchee

Ghana 
Godfred Karikari - Rangers, Happy Valley
Wisdom Fofo Agbo - Rangers, TSW Pegasus
Anthony Dela Nyatepe - Citizen, Mutual FC, Tai Chung
Yaw Anane - Citizen, South China, Mutual FC, Happy Valley
Moses Mensah - Citizen
Stephen Joseph Musah - Citizen
Christian Annan - Wofoo Tai Po
Bishop Sarpong Owusu - Bulova Rangers
Charles Ghansa Benin - Mutual FC, Happy Valley
Ayo Hassan Raimi - Tuen Mun Progoal
Francis Oppong - NTR WF Tai Po

Guinea 
Mamoudou Cissé - Happy Valley

Hungary 
Zoltán Ghéczy - Shatin

India 
 Manprit Singh – Wofoo Tai Po, Hong Kong FC, Rangers
 Hardikpreet Singh – Hong Kong FC
Deepak Sharma – Wong Tai Sin DRSC
 Navaldeep Singh – Eastern District SA

Ireland 
Colin Baker - Rangers, Hong Kong FC
Peter Foley - Bulova SA
Terry Conroy - Bulova SA

Japan 
Hisanori Takada - Eastern, Bulova Rangers, Citizen
Tomoaki Seino - Convoy Sun Hei
Asahi Yamamoto - Fourway Athletics, Sun Hei
Yuto Nakamura - TSW Pegasus
Masayuki Okano - TSW Pegasus
Dan Ito - Tuen Mun Progoal
Takashi Fujii - Shatin, Sun Hei

Macedonia 
Goran Stankovski - Kitchee

Malawi 
Elvis Kafoteka - Bulova Rangers

Nigeria 
Festus Baise - Citizen
Cornelius Udebuluzor - Rangers
Victor Eromosele Inegbenoise - Xiangxue Sun Hei
Donatus Chinedu Aghadinuno - Bulova Rangers, Mutual FC
Caleb Ekwenugo - Convoy Sun Hei, Bulova Rangers, Fourway Athletics, NTR WF Tai Po
David Ifeanyi Godwin - Lanwa Redbull, Sheffield United
Alexander Akande - Eastern, Tai Chung, Kitchee
Eze Isiocha - Happy Valley
Ande Apollo - Mutual FC
Tunde Seun Olokigbe - Tuen Mun Progoal
Emmanuel John - Tuen Mun Progoal

Paraguay 
Aldo Arsenio Villalba Torres - Lanwa Redbull
Aníbal Pacheco Orzuza - Lanwa Redbull

Peru 
Antonio Serrano - Xiangxue Sun Hei

Portugal 
André Correia - South China
Carlos Miguel da Silva Oliveira - South China
Hugo Nunes Coelho - South China
Marco Antonio Mendes de Almeida - South China
Luciano Guedes Brandao da Rocha - Bulova Rangers
Nuno Miguel Mendes Cavaleiro - South China, Bulova Rangers

Romania 
Petrișor Voinea - TSW Pegasus

Russia 
Torin William Didenko - Hong Kong FC

Saint Kitts and Nevis 
Keith Gumbs - Kitchee

Serbia 
Dragutin Stević-Ranković - Rangers
Ivan Jević - Kitchee
Darko Rakočević - Kitchee
Mihailo Jovanović - Rangers, South China
Pavle Lakić - Happy Valley
Nemanja Simović - Happy Valley
Mirko Teodorović - Shatin

South Africa 
Saleh Amisi - Fourway Athletics
Makhosonke Erol Bhengu - Fourway Rangers
Sthembiso Nkanyiso Sboniso Ntombela - Fourway Rangers

South Korea 
Kim Yeon-Gun - South China

Spain 
Ernesto Gómez
Sergio Aure - Kitchee
Ubay Luzardo - Kitchee
Javi Pérez - Kitchee
Raúl Torres - Kitchee
Albert Virgili - Kitchee

Togo 
Cristiano Alves Pereira - South China

Uruguay 
Luis Daniel Cupla Oviedo - Kitchee
Enrique Díaz - Kitchee

Wales 
Richard David Jeffries - Hong Kong FC
　Morgan Powell - Hong Kong FC

Unknown nationality 
Kevin Benjamin Buchanan - Hong Kong FC
Michael John Challoner - Hong Kong FC
Michael Paul Hampshire - Eastern

See also
Hong Kong First Division League
Hong Kong Senior Shield
Hong Kong League Cup
Hong Kong FA Cup
Hong Kong Viceroy Cup
Hong Kong League XI
Guangdong-Hong Kong Cup
Lunar New Year Cup

References

 
Hong Kong First Division League
Association football player non-biographical articles